Love in Every Port (Spanish:En cada puerto un amor) is a 1931 American drama film directed by Carlos F. Borcosque and Marcel Silver and starring José Crespo, Conchita Montenegro and Juan de Landa. It is the Spanish-language version of Way for a Sailor directed by Sam Wood. Translating and altering the original script was overseen by Edgar Neville, a Spaniard with strong connections in the United States, and was part of a trend of making multiple language versions during the early years of sound before dubbing became more commonplace.

Cast
 José Crespo as Jack  
 Conchita Montenegro as Elena  
 Juan de Landa as Tripode  
 Romualdo Tirado as Timon  
 Elena Landeros as Margot  
 Rosita Granada as Lulu

References

Bibliography
 Bentley, Bernard. A Companion to Spanish Cinema. Boydell & Brewer 2008.

External links 

1931 films
1931 drama films
American drama films
1930s Spanish-language films
Spanish-language American films
Films directed by Carlos F. Borcosque
Metro-Goldwyn-Mayer films
American black-and-white films
American multilingual films
1931 multilingual films
1930s American films